‘Adī ibn Musāfir (born 1072-1078, died 1162) was a Muslim sheikh of Arab origin, considered a Yazidi saint. The Yazidis consider him as an avatar of Tawûsê Melek (also called Melek Taûs), which means "Peacock Angel". His tomb at Lalish, Iraq is a focal point of Yazidi pilgrimage.

Biography 
Sheikh Adi was born in the 1070s in the village of Bait Far, in the Beqaa Valley of present-day Lebanon. ‘Adī's house of his birth is a place of pious pilgrimage to this day. Descending from the family of Marwan I, the Caliph of the Umayyads, he was raised in a Muslim environment. His early life he spent in Baghdad, where he became a disciple of the Muslim mystic Ahmad Ghazali, among his fellow students in Ghazali's circle were the Muslim mystics Abu al-Najib Suhrawardi and Abdul Qadir Gilani; with the latter he undertook a journey to Mecca. He became a disciple also to Hammad ad Dabbas and then Oqeil al Manbidji, from who he received the Khirqa. With time he became a teacher himself. He chose an ascetic way of life, left Baghdad and settled in Lalish. Despite his desire for seclusion, he impressed the local population with his asceticism and miracles. He became well known in present-day Iraq and Syria and disciples moved to the valley of Lalish to live close to Sheikh Adi. Following he founded the Adawiyya order. The Valley of Lalish is located within the environs of the village of Ba'adra, 20 miles to the east of the Nestorian convent of Rabban-Hormizd. Before he died, he named his successor his nephew Sakhr Abu l-Barakat. 

Physically, he  was said to be very tanned and of middle stature. He lived an ascetic lifestyle in the mountains in the region north of Mosul not far from the local Hakkari Kurds. As people flocked to his residency in the hills, he would end up founding a religious order later referred to as al-'Adawiyya ('the followers of 'Adi'). He died between 1162 CE (557 Hijra) and 1160 CE (555 Hijra) in the hermitage that he had built with his followers in the mountain.

Religion 
In his writings he reasoned that it was god who created the devil and evil for which he cited passages of the Quran and the Hadiths. He also taught that the true Muslim should adhere to the teachings in the Quran and the Sunna and that only the ones who follow the principles of the Muslim caliphs Abu Bakr, Uthman and Ali are true believers. According to some sources, he established the Sufi Adawiyya order. He shall have performed several miraculous acts such as reading in the others thoughts, become invisible, to move a mountain by force of his word and once also returned the life of a man who was crushed by a rock.   Some Muslims respect him as one of the pioneers of asceticism and the scholars of Sufism who held firmly to the Quran and Sunnah.

Aftermath and legacy 
This hermitage within the Valley of Lalish, would continue to be occupied by his followers and his descendants until the present day despite periods of unrest, destruction, and persecution by outsiders. In 1254, as a result of a violent conflict with the members of the Adawiyya order, the Atabeg of Mosul, Badr al-Din Lu'lu ordered the bones of Sheikh Adi to be exhumed and burned. As the holiest site in the Yezidi religion, his tomb (marked by three conical cupolas) still attracts a great number of people even outside holy festivals and pilgrimages. Nightly processions by torch light include exhibitions of the green colored pall, which covers the tomb; and the distribution of large trays with smoking harisa (a ragout with coagulated milk).

Books of Sheikh Adi ibn Musafir
Four books attributed to Sheikh Adi have been preserved: 
The doctrine of the Sunnis
The Book of the formation of the soul
Instructions of Sheikh Adi ibn Musafir to the successor
Instructions to his disciple, the leading sheikh, and the other murids. This book focus on several issues but are in lone with Islamic teaching, which according to the Hanbali scholar Ibn Taymiyyah describes Sheikh Adi as a "sincere Muslim who followed the Sunnah of the Prophet".

Succession

References

1070s births
1162 deaths
Yazidi mythology
Adawiyya Sufi Order
Burials in Iraq
Deified people
Founders of Sufi orders
Muslim saints
Sunni Muslim scholars of Islam
12th-century Muslim theologians
Sunni fiqh scholars
Sunni imams
11th-century Arabs
12th-century Arabs
Yazidi religion
Yazidi holy figures